BMC Health Services Research is an open access healthcare journal, which covers research on the subject of health services. It was established in 2001 and is published by BioMed Central.

Abstracting and indexing 
BMC Health Services Research is abstracted and indexed in PubMed, MEDLINE, Chemical Abstracts Service, EMBASE, Scopus, CINAHL, Current Contents, and CAB International. The journal is included in the Web of Science and according to the Journal Citation Reports has a 2018 impact factor of 1.932.

All articles are also archived by PubMed Central, the University of Potsdam, INIST, and in e-Depot.

See also
 BMC journals
 Human Resources for Health on BioMed Central

References

External links

 

BioMed Central academic journals
Publications established in 2001
Creative Commons Attribution-licensed journals
Public health journals
English-language journals